Felice Gasperi (26 December 1903 – 23 May 1982) was an Italian footballer who played as a defender. He competed with Italy in the 1928 Summer Olympics.

International career
With Italy, Gasperi won the Olympic bronze medal at the 1928 Summer Olympics in the men's football team competition, but because of a disputed game in some accounts of that history, his name is not listed among the medal winners.
What is without a doubt though is, that he did start in two matches for Italy in the silver winning 1931-32 Central European International Cup campaign.

Honours

Club
Bologna
Italian Football Championship: 1924–25, 1928–29, 1935–36, 1936–37

International 
Italy
 Central European International Cup: Runner-up: 1931-32
 Summer Olympics: Bronze 1928

References

External links
 Athlete profile at the Enciclopedia-football.com

1903 births
1982 deaths
Italian footballers
Footballers at the 1928 Summer Olympics
Olympic footballers of Italy
Olympic bronze medalists for Italy
Olympic medalists in football
Medalists at the 1928 Summer Olympics
Association football defenders
Italy international footballers
Footballers from Bologna
Bologna F.C. 1909 players